Bradford Abbas Railway Cutting is a 1.4 hectare geological Site of Special Scientific Interest in Dorset, notified in 1990.

Sources
 English Nature citation sheet for the site (accessed 31 August 2006)

External links
 English Nature website (SSSI information)

Sites of Special Scientific Interest in Dorset
Sites of Special Scientific Interest notified in 1990
Railway cuttings in the United Kingdom
Rail transport in Dorset
Geology of Dorset